Capitán Germán Quiroga Guardia Airport  is an airport serving San Borja, a town in the Beni Department of Bolivia. The runway is in the eastern side of the town.

The San Borja VOR (Ident: BOR) and non-directional beacon (Ident: SRJ) are located on the field.

Accidents and incidents
 On 18 January 1976, Douglas C-47 CP-573 of Frigorifico Maniqui crashed near Capitán Germán Quiroga Guardia Airport, following a failure of the starboard engine. The aircraft was on a domestic non-scheduled passenger flight. Seven of the ten people on board were killed.

See also
Transport in Bolivia
List of airports in Bolivia

References

External links 
Capitán Av. German Quiroga G. Airport at OpenStreetMap
Capitán Av. German Quiroga G. Airport at OurAirports

Capitán Av. German Quiroga G. Airport at FallingRain

Airports in Beni Department